Charles Michael "Bucky" Lasek (born December 3, 1972) is an American professional skateboarder and rallycross driver.

Career

Professional skateboarding
Born in Baltimore, Maryland, Lasek started skateboarding at the age of 12, shortly after his bike was stolen. After entering amateur contests, he was quickly noticed by Powell Peralta talent scouts in 1987.  Powell Peralta promptly sponsored Lasek and introduced him in a 1987 publication as a 14 year old newly-sponsored amateur who "rides a mini-Caballero with X-Bones."  Lasek made his video debut in the fourth Bones Brigade video, Public Domain (1988).

Lasek attained professional status with Powell in 1990, but by this time, skateboarding, and vert skateboarding (Lasek's discipline) in particular, began to lose popularity and his career waned. After vert skateboarding was included as part of the X Games by ESPN in the mid-1990s, Lasek's career was revived. A move from Baltimore to San Diego in the summer of 1998 helped his career further.

As of May 2009, Lasek owns a backyard concrete skateboarding bowl named "Lasekland".

Professional racing
In May 2012, Lasek was one of three drivers selected by Subaru Rally Team USA to compete in the 2012 Global RallyCross Championship. Lasek continued with the team earning several second and third place finishes through his career with Subaru. He left the team after the 2016 season.

Video game appearances
Lasek was a playable character in the first five games in the Tony Hawk's series: Tony Hawk's Pro Skater through Tony Hawk's Underground. He also appears in Tony Hawk's Pro Skater 1 + 2.

Film and television
Lasek made a cameo appearance in the low-budget 2003 movie Haggard, in which he hands a skateboard to Bam Margera while he runs from the villain Hellboy. He appeared in MTV's reality television series Viva La Bam and in the music video for Pink's single "Raise Your Glass". He served as a stunt double in the 2003 movie Grind. He also made an appearance as himself in an episode of The Jersey called "What's Gotten Into Elliott Rifkin?", and also attended the sixth dinner service of Hell's Kitchen's 21st season.

Personal life
As of June 2015, Lasek resides in Encinitas, California with his wife Jennifer (m. September 1996) and their three daughters.

Contest results
As of 2016, Lasek has won 13 medals at the X Games, including ten gold medals, and is one of only two vert skateboarders to have won three X Games gold medals consecutively—the other is Pierre-Luc Gagnon. Lasek is also one of only three athletes to compete at every X Games since the series' inception in 1995.

1st 2013 X Games (Los Angeles): Vert
 1st 2013 X Games (Munich): Vert
1st 2013 X Games (Barcelona): Vert
1st 2013 x Games (Foz do Iguacu): Vert
1st 2013 Vans Pool Party 
 2nd 2012 X Games: Vert
 3rd 2011 X Games: Vert
 1st 2010 Vans Pro-Tec Pool Party: Pro Division
 1st 2009 Dew Action Sports Tour: Vert
 1st 2009 Vans Pro-Tec Pool Party: Pro Division
 1st 2008 Dew Action Sports Tour: Vert
 1st 2006 Dew Action Sports Tour: Vert
 1st 2006 X Games: Vert Best Trick
 1st 2005 Dew Action Sports Tour: Vert
 1st 2004 Vans Triple Crown
 1st 2004 Gravity Games
 1st 2004 Slam City Jam
 1st 2003 X Games: Vert
 1st 2003 X Games: Vert Doubles (with Bob Burnquist)
 1st 2002 Slam City Jam: Vert
 2nd 2002 X Games VIII: Vert Doubles (with Bob Burnquist)
 2nd 2001 X Games: Vert
 1st 2000 X Games: Vert
 1st 1999 X Games Vert

Racing record

Complete Global RallyCross Championship results

Supercar

Race canceled

References

External links
 Official skateboarding website 
 
 
 

1972 births
Living people
American skateboarders
X Games athletes
Global RallyCross Championship drivers
People from Dundalk, Maryland